In Finland is a live album by multi-instrumentalist Joe McPhee, pianist Matthew Shipp and bassist Dominic Duval recorded in 2004 and released on the Cadence Jazz label.

Reception

Allmusic reviewer Steve Loewy states "By the end of this full-length recording, the listener has participated in a journey that applies new perspectives to common themes, challenges traditional concepts, and soars toward a paradigm of order and structure that emerges from a morass of free improvisation -- a magnificent feat that sparkles majestically". On All About Jazz Rex Butters wrote "These three musicians blend their distinctive voices to unite in the interwoven wonder of improvised performance. Maintaining a compelling dynamism throughout, In Finland captures a valuable musical moment and brings an updated look at Matthew Shipp for some thirsty ears". In JazzTimes Mike Shanley noted "Ultimately, the touchstones are noticeable but they're outweighed by the music that McPhee, Shipp and Duval create in the moment.

Track listing 
All compositions by Joe McPhee, Matthew Shipp and Domenic Duval.
 "Never Before" – 32:43
 "Never Again" – 25:29
 "In Finland" – 14:45

Personnel 
Joe McPhee – soprano saxophone, pocket trumpet
Matthew Shipp – piano
Dominic Duval – bass

References 

 

Joe McPhee live albums
Matthew Shipp live albums
2005 live albums
Cadence Jazz Records live albums